Devon Rouse (born July 18, 1998) is an American professional dirt track and stock car racing driver who primarily competes in sprint cars at local tracks in Iowa. He also competed part-time in the NASCAR Camping World Truck Series, driving the No. 43 Chevrolet Silverado for Reaume Brothers Racing.

Racing career
A fan of NASCAR Cup Series champion Jeff Gordon who hoped to emulate his career path from dirt to stock car racing, Rouse began kart racing when he was three years old. He competed in the discipline until he was 13 and won six track championships at Shimek Speedway prior to its closing; he also competed in modified cars for six years.

On his 17th birthday, Rouse received a sprint car from his parents and started racing at 34 Raceway. He finished third in the track's class standings in 2016, followed by second the following year.

While vacationing in Florida in October 2019, Rouse befriended a NASCAR Camping World Truck Series crew member who invited him to travel with the team for six weeks. In January 2020, Rouse tested a truck at Myrtle Beach Speedway. He had planned to run the Truck Series' Eldora Dirt Derby at Eldora Speedway before the race was canceled due to the COVID-19 pandemic.

Before the 2021 racing season, he joined Fast Track Racing for the ARCA Menards Series test at Daytona International Speedway. Running the Friday practice session, he was the 46th-fastest driver of 56 in total. He also signed with Reaume Brothers Racing to run the Truck Series' Pinty's Dirt Truck Race and Corn Belt 150 at Bristol Motor Speedway and Knoxville Raceway, respectively, though the former was aborted due to sponsorship issues and personal reasons.

Personal life
Rouse graduated from West Burlington High School in Iowa in 2016 and was a business administration major at Southeastern Community College. He worked at DuPont in Fort Madison for three years before forming a detailing business.

Rouse is openly gay. When he participated in the ARCA test at Daytona in 2021, he became the first openly LGBT driver to compete in an ARCA-sanctioned event. His Truck debut at Knoxville later that year made him the first such driver to race in the series since Stephen Rhodes in 2003.

Motorsports career results

NASCAR
(key) (Bold – Pole position awarded by qualifying time. Italics – Pole position earned by points standings or practice time. * – Most laps led.)

Camping World Truck Series

 Season still in progress
 Ineligible for series points

See also
 List of LGBT sportspeople

References

External links
 
 

Living people
American LGBT sportspeople
NASCAR drivers
People from Burlington, Iowa
LGBT people from Iowa
LGBT racing drivers
1998 births
Gay sportsmen
Racing drivers from Iowa
21st-century LGBT people